Vakrangee Limited is a technology company based in Mumbai, India that provides banking, insurance, e-governance, e-commerce, and logistics services. The company is one of the main providers of the software and equipment for voter id cards and Aadhaar cards.

As per Forbes, the company is the largest single systems integrator for all key government projects in India. As of June 2018, its largest owners included the promoter's family, the government of Singapore, Wellington trust company, Life insurance corporation and Jagdishchander Bansal.

History
Vakrangee limited was founded in Marol Naka, Mumbai 1990 by Dinesh Nandwana, a Chartered Accountant(CA). Though the company commenced its operations as a technology consultancy, it gradually expanded its operations, first in making voter identity cards in 1993, and subsequently as a franchisee for making Aadhaar UID cards in 2010.

Operations
Vakrangee operates a franchisee network of more than 37,000 centers known as "Vakrangee Kendras" in 16 states of India. These centers undertake a mix of tasks, from voter ids, aadhaar registration, as well as white label ATMs (ATM machines used by different banks). Most of its centers act as "last-mile retail points of sale" and are located in the rural, semi-urban and urban areas that do not have access to technology and often electricity.

Vakrangee also operates e-Governance projects with the Government of India.

Vakrangee Kendras 
As of December 2017, the company operated 44,286 Vakrangee Kendras through a franchisee based model. Each outlet provides a range of services related to the government of India under various e-governance initiatives of the government. These include disbursement of money under Direct Benefit Transfer scheme, pension and basic banking under National Pension System and Pradhan Mantri Jan Dhan Yojana, processing of passports, microinsurance under Atal Pension Yojana, Pradhan Mantri Jeevan Jyoti Bima Yojana & Pradhan Mantri Suraksha Bima Yojana, tax & cess collection, enrollment and issuance of Aadhaar Card, NREGA Job Card, Election Card, Passport, birth, death, domicile and land record certificates among other services.

Vakrangee Kendras also provides various other services like banking by acting as banking correspondent for many scheduled commercial banks and insurance as a corporate agent to some insurance companies, utility bill, mobile & DTH payments, ticketing & logistics, e-learning & certifications, and e-commerce through Amazon.in. The company, licensed by the Reserve Bank of India, operates a network of white labeled Vakrangee ATM centers.

e-Governance Projects
Under this segment, Vakrangee delivers IT & IT enabled services to Government of India, various state governments, and Government of Philippines. These projects include collection services, recruitment application processing for government-related services, grievance management services, land records digitization, electoral rolls among others

References 

Indian companies established in 1990
Companies based in Mumbai
Technology companies established in 1990
1990 establishments in Maharashtra
Companies listed on the National Stock Exchange of India
Companies listed on the Bombay Stock Exchange